Ana Franco de la Vega (born 6 June 1999) is a Spanish footballer who plays as a midfielder for Sevilla.

Club career
Franco started her career at Cáceres.

International career
Franco has been called up regularly to the Spain under-23 team.

References

External links
Profile at La Liga

1999 births
Living people
Women's association football midfielders
Spanish women's footballers
People from Cáceres, Spain
Sportspeople from the Province of Cáceres
Footballers from Extremadura
Sevilla FC (women) players
Primera División (women) players